St. Paul's Catholic School is a Catholic primary and lower secondary school in Bergen, established in 1873 and owned by the Roman Catholic Diocese of Oslo. About 340 students attend the school from first to tenth grade. The headmaster is Ronny Michelsen.

The school is located near Saint Paul's Catholic Church, Bergen and is closely attached to the church.

In Autumn 2012 the school opened a high school branch: St. Paul's Catholic High School.

See also
Catholic Church in Norway

References

External links
 Saint Paul's School official website

Primary schools in Norway
Secondary schools in Norway
Schools in Bergen
1873 establishments in Norway
Christian schools in Norway
Educational institutions established in 1873
Catholicism in Norway